The following is a list of food cooperative grocery stores and buyers groups, current and defunct. Many of the second-wave food cooperatives formed in the 1960s and 1970s started as buying clubs.

This list is not exhaustive, and is limited to notable food cooperatives.

Australia
Alfalfa House, Enmore, Sydney

Germany 

 FoodHub, Munich
 SuperCoop, Berlin

France 

 La Louve, Paris

Ireland
Dublin Food Co-op, Dublin City
The Urban Co-op, Limerick

Sweden
 Kooperativa Förbundet

United Kingdom

Daily Bread Co-operative
Infinity Foods, Brighton
 The People's Supermarket
Unicorn Grocery

United States
 4th Street Food Co-op, New York City
 Berkeley Student Food Collective, Berkeley, California
 Boise Co-op, Boise, Idaho
 Citizens Co-op, Gainesville, Florida (defunct)
 Consumers' Cooperative of Berkeley, Berkeley, California (defunct)
 The Cooperative Grocery, Emeryville, California (defunct)
 District Grocery Stores – a former cooperative of small single-room grocery stores in Washington, DC, Maryland and Northern Virginia that operated from 1921 to 1972.
 Frontier Natural Products Co-op, Norway, Iowa
 George Street Co-op, New Brunswick, New Jersey
 Good Foods Co-op, Lexington Kentucky
 Maryland Food Collective at the University of Maryland, College Park, Maryland 
 New Pioneer Food Co-op, Iowa City, Iowa
 Oberlin Student Cooperative Association – a housing cooperative and food cooperative in Oberlin, Ohio
 Ocean Beach People's Organic Food Market in Ocean Beach, San Diego, California
 Park Slope Food Coop, New York City, New York
 PCC Community Markets (formerly branded as Puget Consumers Co-op and PCC Natural Markets), Seattle, Washington
 People's Food Co-op, Portland, Oregon
 Phat Beets Produce, Oakland, California
 Rainbow Grocery Cooperative, San Francisco, California
 Three Rivers Market, Knoxville, Tennessee
 Wedge Community Co-op, Minneapolis, Minnesota
 West Oakland Food Collaborative, Oakland, California
 Wheatsville Co-op, Austin, Texas
 Whole Foods Co-op, Duluth, Minnesota
 Willy Street Cooperative, Madison, Wisconsin
 Ypsilanti Food Co-op, Ypsilanti, Michigan

See also 

 History of the cooperative movement
 List of food companies
 List of cooperatives
 National Co+op Grocers

References

External links 

 Map of Food Coops

Lists of cooperatives
Cooperatives